Stenoma phalacropa is a moth in the family Depressariidae. It was described by Edward Meyrick in 1932. It is found in Panama.

References

Moths described in 1932
Stenoma
Taxa named by Edward Meyrick